Tamás Somorácz (born 11 April 1992) is a Hungarian canoeist. He won the 2016 European title in the K-4 500 m and a bronze medal at the 2015 World Championships in the K-2 500 m event. His team finished 11th in the K-4 1000 metres event at the 2016 Summer Olympics.

Somorácz began paddling aged eight in Paks, following his father and brother. They did canoeing, but it did not work with Tamás, and he changed to kayak.

References

External links
 

1992 births
Living people
Hungarian male canoeists
Olympic canoeists of Hungary
Canoeists at the 2016 Summer Olympics
People from Szekszárd
Sportspeople from Tolna County
21st-century Hungarian people